Ruslan Abbasov (born 24 June 1986) is a track and field sprint athlete who competes internationally for Azerbaijan.

Abbasov represented Azerbaijan at the 2008 Summer Olympics in Beijing. He competed at the 100 metres sprint and placed 5th in his heat without advancing to the second round. He ran the distance in a time of 10.58 seconds.

References

External Links 

 

1986 births
Living people
Olympic athletes of Azerbaijan
Athletes (track and field) at the 2008 Summer Olympics
Azerbaijani male sprinters